Lobiger souverbii is a species of small sea snail or sea slug, a marine gastropod mollusk in the family Oxynoidae.

Distribution
The type locality for this species is Guadeloupe.

References

External links 
 Sea Slug Forum info

Oxynoidae
Gastropods described in 1856